Epimactis icterina is a moth in the family Lecithoceridae. It was described by Edward Meyrick in 1931. It is found in northern Vietnam.

References

Moths described in 1931
Epimactis
Taxa named by Edward Meyrick